Beihaibei is a station on Line 6 of the Beijing Subway. This station opened on December 30, 2012. It is named for the nearby Beihai Park.

Station Layout 
The station has an underground island platform.

Exits 
There are 3 exits, lettered A, B, and D. Exit A is accessible.

Around the station
 Office of the Government of the Hong Kong Special Administrative Region in Beijing

Gallery

References

External links

Railway stations in China opened in 2012
Beijing Subway stations in Xicheng District